Peter Ayodele Curtis Joseph (8 November 1920 – 15 December 2006) was born in Ikare, Nigeria. He was a left nationalist and the first Nigerian to receive a Lenin Peace Prize in 1965.

References 

1920 births
2006 deaths
Lenin Peace Prize recipients
People from Ondo State